World Netball, previously known as the International Netball Federation and  the International Federation of Netball Associations, is the worldwide governing body for Netball. The INF was created in 1960  and is responsible for world rankings, maintaining the rules for netball and organising the Netball World Cup and Netball at the Commonwealth Games

In June 2021 INF announced an official rebrand and became known as World Netball.

General information
The organisation is based in Manchester, England. The INF has over 70 national members which are grouped into five regional areas: Africa, Asia, Americas, Europe and Oceania. The INF is governed by a congress that meets every two years, a board of directors that meets three times a year, a chief executive officer and a Secretariat. It is also responsible for providing world rankings for national representative teams. The INF organises several major international competitions including the Netball World Cup and Netball World Youth Cup. It is also a signatory to the World Anti-Doping Code.

History
In 1957, a pair of national netball organisations discussed the need to create an international governing body for the sport to help address issues like standardising the rules. This conversation was started between England and Australia, while Australia was touring England. In 1960, netball representatives from Australia, England, New Zealand, South Africa and the West Indies finally gathered to create the needed organisation, the International Federation of Women's Basketball and Netball. The meeting took place in Sri Lanka (then known as Ceylon), with rules for the newly creating organisation being created. A decision was made at this first meeting create a world championship competition for the sport to be held every four years, with the first event to be held in 1963 in Eastbourne, England.

The organisation has since undergone lies several changes. After all countries adopted the name "netball" for the sport, the organisation was renamed the "International Federation of Netball Associations" (IFNA). This name was used until November 2012, when the organisation changed to its current name, the "International Netball Federation" (INF), to bring it in line with other sports governing bodies.

Netball World Cup

The INF is responsible for organising the Netball World Cup (formerly the World Netball Championships), the premier event in international netball, held every four years. The table below contains a list of these championships/cups, where they took place and how many teams competed in the event and the winners.

Netball World Youth Cup
The INF is responsible for organising the Netball World Youth Cup (formerly the World Youth Netball Championships), the premier event in international netball, held every four years in a year other than that of the Netball World Cup. The Netball World Youth Cup is the pinnacle of netball competition for emerging players who are under 21 years of age and the INF has held an U21 international competition every four years since 1988. The table below contains a list of these championships/cups, where they took place and how many teams competed in the event and the winners.

Fast5 Netball World Series

The Fast5 Netball World Series is an international competition that features modified Fast5 rules, and has been likened to Twenty20 cricket and rugby sevens. The competition is contested by the six top national netball teams in the world, according to the INF World Rankings, with teams from Australia, England, Fiji, Jamaica, Malawi New Zealand, Samoa and South Africa having played in the series so far.
The Series was first held in England from 2009-2011 and the game played was called Fast Net, this evolved into Fast5 in 2012.

Goals and objectives

The INF’s fundamental purpose is to promote, improve and grow netball globally, in accordance with the ideals and objects of the Olympic and Commonwealth movements.
One of the goals of the INF is to attain International Olympic Committee (IOC) recognition for netball and to lobby for the sport's inclusion at future Olympic Games.

National organisations
The INF is responsible for Netball across the Globe with currently (March 2022) 88 Members, 65 Full Members and 23 Associate Members across 5 Regions; Africa, America, Asia, Europe and Oceania. 117 countries interest to netball. 39 Nations only interest and havent teams and federations.

Members by Regions

Members
This list is incomplete:

Timeline
The following (incomplete) list is a timeline of national organisations becoming affiliated with the International Netball Federation:

1960
 Australia
 England
 New Zealand
 South Africa
 Welsh Netball Association

1978
 India
 Saint Kitts and Nevis State Netball Association

1992
 United States

2010
 Switzerland 

2019
 Bangladesh

See also
 INF World Rankings
 Netball World Cup
 World Netball Series
 List of national netball teams
 Asian Netball Championships
 European Netball Championship

References

Bibliography

External links
 
 INF blog
 "IFNA" on Facebook

  
   
Sports organizations established in 1960
1960 establishments in England
Organisations based in Manchester